"Janani Janmabhumishcha Swargadapi Gariyasi" is a hemistich of a Sanskrit shloka from Ramayana, and the national motto of Government of Nepal.

Translation
"Mother and motherland are superior even to Heaven."

Origin
The verse might be present in certain recensions of the Hindu epic Ramayana, though it is not present in its Critical Edition.

Further, at least two versions of the shloka are prevalent. In one version (found in an edition published by Hindi Prachara Press, Madras in 1930 by T. R. Krishna Chary, Editor and T. R. Vemkoba Chary the publisher at 6:124:17) it is spoken by Bharadwaja addressing Rama:

मित्राणि धन धान्यानि प्रजानां सम्मतानिव |
जननी जन्म भूमिश्च स्वर्गादपि गरीयसी ||
Translation: "Friends, riches and grains are highly honoured in this world. (But) mother and motherland are superior even to heaven."

In another version, it is spoken by Rama to Lakshmana:
अपि स्वर्णमयी लङ्का न मे लक्ष्मण रोचते |
जननी जन्मभूमिश्च स्वर्गादपि गरीयसी ||
Translation: "Lakshmana, even this golden Lanka does not appeal to me. Mother and motherland are superior even to heaven."

See also

Ramayana
Coat of arms of Nepal
List of national mottos

References
http://www.lawcommission.gov.np/np/archives/846
Government of Nepal
National symbols of Nepal
National mottos
Sanskrit mottos